The 1948 Rutgers Queensmen football team represented Rutgers University in the 1948 college football season. In their seventh season under head coach Harvey Harman, the Queensmen compiled a 7–2 record, won the Middle Three Conference championship, and outscored their opponents 224 to 130. 

On October 16, 1948, Rutgers defeated Princeton, 22-6, in front of a crowd of 41,000 at Palmer Stadium in Princeton, New Jersey. This was the first Rutgers victory at Princeton in 79 years of play between the two schools, ending what the Associated Press called "the oldest jinx in intercollegiate football history."

Schedule

References

Rutgers
Rutgers Scarlet Knights football seasons
Rutgers Queensmen football